The SK-42 reference system also known as the Krasovsky 1940 ellipsoid, is a coordinate system established in the Soviet Union in 1942 as Systema koordinat, and provides parameters which are linked to the geocentric Cartesian coordinate system PZ-90. It was used in geodetic calculations, notably in military mapping and determining state borders. 

The Krasovsky 1940 ellipsoid uses a semi-major axis (equatorial radius)  of 6,378,245 m, and an inverse flattening  of 298.3

Citations and notes

Geodesy
Navigation
Surveying
Geographic coordinate systems
Geography of the Soviet Union
Science and technology in the Soviet Union